Catocala tokui is a moth of the family Erebidae. It is found in Japan (Honshu, Kyushu, Tsushima, Yakushima) and Taiwan.

The wingspan is about 47 mm.

References

External links
Catocala of Asia

tokui
Moths of Asia
Moths described in 1976